PHOTO was the name of an American photographic magazine geared towards men. It was published monthly by the Official Magazine Corporation beginning in June 1952. The magazine mainly featured photographs of scantily-clad women, although there were also exposés, featured articles, and examples of photojournalism.

See also
 Cover girl
 List of men's magazines
 Pin-up girl

References

Men's magazines published in the United States
Monthly magazines published in the United States
Defunct magazines published in the United States
Magazines established in 1952
Magazines with year of disestablishment missing
Photography in the United States
Photography magazines
Photojournalistic magazines